A yogi is an advanced practitioner of yoga in Eastern religions.

Yogi may also refer to:

People
 Yogi Adityanath (born 1972), Chief Minister of the Indian state of Uttar Pradesh
 Yogi Berra (1925–2015), American Hall-of-Fame Major League Baseball player, manager and coach
 Yogi Ferrell (born 1993), American basketball player
 John Hughes (footballer, born 1943), Scottish footballer
 John Hughes (footballer, born 1964), Scottish footballer
 Yogi Huyghebaert (1944–2018), Canadian politician
 Yogi Roth (born 1981), American college football player and coach, broadcaster, and filmmaker
 Ian Stannard (born 1987), British racing cyclist
 Michael Stewart (basketball) (born 1975), American retired National Basketball Association player
 Jaroslav Svejkovský (born 1976), Czech retired hockey player
 Yogi Triana (born 1994), Indonesian football goalkeeper
 Maharishi Mahesh Yogi (1918–2008), developer of the Transcendental Meditation technique; guru to the Beatles and other celebrities
 MC Yogi (born 1979), American rapper
 Yogie (born 1973), Indian director
 Yogesh (actor) (born 1990), actor in Kannada films sometimes billed as Yogi

Arts and entertainment
 Yogi Bear, a Hanna-Barbera cartoon character
 Yogi Yorgesson, a character played by Harry Stewart (1908–1956), Norwegian-American entertainer
 The Yogi, a 1916 German silent film
 Yogi (2007 film), a Telugu-language film starring Prabhas and Nayanthara, directed by V.V. Vinayak
 Yogi (2009 film), a Tamil-language film starring Ameer Sultan and Madhumitha, directed by Subramaniam Siva
 "Yogi", a 1960 single by The Ivy Three

Other uses
 Yogi Rock, a rock on the planet Mars, named after Yogi Bear
 Yogi Tea, a manufacturer of tea products
 Aerodyne Yogi, a French paraglider design
 Yogi (superyacht) was a motoryacht completed in 2011 that sunk in 2012

See also
 Yog (disambiguation)
 Yoga (disambiguation)